The Volleyball 2021–22 V.League Division 1 Women's is the 28th volleyball tournament year and includes the 4th top level women's volleyball tournament of the newly branded and reorganized V.League (Japan) scheduled for October 15, 2021 – April 17, 2022.

The V.League Division 1 Women's teams compete in four tournaments each year:

 V.Summer League starts the season June 25 – July 4, 2021 and includes teams from V.League Division 2 Women's and two University selection teams. This is its 40th tournament year. Its main purpose is the strengthening and training of new and younger players.
 The main V.League Division 1 Women's tournament starts October 15, 2021 and ends April 7, 2021 with a winter break December 6, 2021 to January 7, 2022.
 The Empress' Cup Final Round is scheduled for December 10–19, 2021 during the winter break of the main V.League Division 1 Women's tournament. The Final Round is the culmination of a month's long qualification process where high school, university, business, and club teams participate in Prefectural and Block Round competitions for a chance to play in the Final Round. Sixteen teams will join the V.League Division 1 Women's teams in the Final Round.   See also Japanese Wikipedia article: Reiwa 3rd Emperor's Cup / Empress's Cup All Japan Volleyball Championship (in Japanese) :ja:令和3年度天皇杯・皇后杯全日本バレーボール選手権大会 
 The Kurowashiki All Japan Volleyball Tournament opens in May every year in Osaka and serves as the final competition of the season.

Clubs

Personnel

Foreign players
The number of foreign players is restricted to one per club worldwide plus one per club from ASEAN nations.

Transfer players

Venues

Schedule 
Regular Round begins October 15, 2021 (Saturday) and ends March 27, 2022 (Sunday). Matches are played every Saturday and Sunday along with a couple Friday Night matches.

 Each team will play every other team three times for a total of thirty-three matches
 It is not a strict round robin
 A theme this season is for each team to host at least one opponent two nights in a row at their home arena
 Teams are ranked in the Regular Round by:
 Wins ->Points ->Set Percentage ->Scoring Rate
 The top three teams from the Regular Round will advance to the Final Stage
 Ranking of 4th to 12th place will be the ranking of the Regular Round and will be the final ranking. The 11th and 12th placed teams will compete in the V.Challenge Match. 

Final Stage begins April 9, 2022 and ends April 17, 2022. 
 Final 3: 
 The 2nd and 3rd ranked teams from the Regular Round will play a one match playoff
 The 2nd ranked team is given a one win advantage
 There are no tie breakers
 If the number of wins is equal a 25 point Golden Set will be played to determine the winner
 Final
 The winner of the Final 3 tournament will play the 1st ranked team from the Regular Round in a two match Final
 No advantage points are given
 No tie breakers
 If the number of wins is equal a 25 point Golden Set will be played to determine the winner

V.Challenge Match (V1-V2 Promotion-Relegation Matches): TBD

Season standing procedure 

The team with the most wins will be ranked highest

Points awarded for a match as follows:
3 points: "3-0" or "3-1" victory
2 points: "3-2" victory
1 point: "2-3" loss
0 points: Lost in "0-3" or "1-3"

If a team abstains for some reason, it will be considered to have lost the game 0-25, 0-25, 0-25 

Tie Breakers are as follows:
If two or more teams have the same number of wins, the team with the most points will be ranked higher
If the number of points is also the same, the team with the highest set rate will be ranked higher
If the set rate is also the same, the team with the highest points rate will be ranked higher

Regular round

Final standing

Individual awards

Match results
Round 1 October 15–17, 2021

Round 2 October 23–24, 2021

Round 3 October 30–31, 2021

Round 4 November 6–7, 2021

Round 5 November 12–14, 2021

Round 6 November 20–21, 2021

Round 7 November 27–28, 2021

Round 8 December 4–5, 2021

Winter break December 6, 2021 to January 9, 2022
Empress' Cup Final Round held December 10–19, 2021 (Hisamitsu Springs wins) 

Round 9 January 8–9, 2021

Round 10 January 15–16, 2022

Round 11 January 22–23, 2022

Round 12 January 29–30, 2022

Round 13 February 5–6, 2022

Final stage

 Final 3 gives an advantage of 1 win to the 2nd place ranked team in the Regular Round.

Match results

Final 3

FINAL

The 2nd round of the FINAL, scheduled for April 16, 2022, was canceled due to several players from both teams having tested positive for the new coronavirus. 

Hisamitsu Springs, who won the first round of the final on April 10, 2022 with a set count of 3-1 will be ranked the highest, the victory will be confirmed, and they are given the Title of Season 2021-22 Champions. JT Marvelous are runners up.

Final ranking

Awards

Regular round 

 Best Scorer Jana Kulan

 Best Spiker  Foluke Akinradewo

 Best Blocker Alyja Daphne Santiago

 Best Server Mioko Yabuta (ja)

 Best Receiver Mako Kobata

Fair Play Award Alyja Daphne Santiago, Mami Yokota

V.League Special Award
For playing more than 10 seasons and more than 230 games:
 Aimi Kawashima (Okayama Seagulls)
 Erika Sakae (Hisamitsu Springs)
 Aya Watanabe (Hitachi Rivale)
 Kotoe Inoue (NEC Red Rockets)
 Fumika Moriya (Denso Airybees)
Outstanding personal records
  Foluke Akinradewo (Hisamitsu Springs)

Final stage 

 Most Valuable Player
 Arisa Inoue (Hisamitsu Springs)
 Best Six
 Andrea Drews (JT Marvelous)
 Jana Kulan (Toray Arrows)
 Arisa Inoue (Hisamitsu Springs)
 Erika Sakae (Hisamitsu Springs)
 Erina Ogawa (Toray Arrows)
 Foluke Akinradewo (Hisamitsu Springs)
 Director Award
 Shingo Sakai (Hisamitsu Springs)

 Best Libero
 Mako Kobata (JT Marvelous)
 Receive Award
 Mana Toe (Hisamitsu Springs)
 Fighting Spirit Award
 Andrea Drews (JT Marvelous)
 Best Newcomer Award
 Melissa Valdes (PFU BlueCats)

 Matsudaira Yasutaka Award
 Shingo Sakai (Hisamitsu Springs)

V.Challenge tournament
V.Challenge Match Women's tournament held April 9–10, 2022

V1 11th vs. V2 2nd (two matches)
V1 12th vs. V2 1st (two matches)
If a V2 team does not have an S1 license, they will not play the tournament, and their V1 opponent remains in V1 unchallenged.

Teams with the most wins will qualify for next season's V1 League. In the case of 1 win and 1 loss, the following will be used as tiebreakers:
Points
Set rate
Score rate

Points are awarded as follows:

 V1 Women's 11th - V2 Women's 2nd

|}
Match Results

 V1 Women's 12th - V2 Women's 1st

|}
Match Results

See also
 2021–22 V.League Division 1 Men's

References

External links
 Official website 

V.Premier League Women
V.Premier League Women
Women's
2019 in Japanese sport
2020 in Japanese sport